Leadership Roundtable (formerly known as the National Leadership Roundtable on Church Management) is a lay-led group born in the midst of the Catholic clergy's sex abuse scandal and dedicated to bringing better administrative practices to dioceses and parishes nationwide.

Leadership Roundtable, founded by its current leader, Geoffrey T. Boisi, in 2006, brings together top Catholic CEOs and leaders in the non-profit sector. In June 2009, they met at the Wharton School of Business and drew a dozen bishops. Boisi, who is a philanthropist and former vice-chairman at JP Morgan Chase, also funded the Geoffrey T. Boisi Professor chair at the Wharton School of the University of Pennsylvania and endowed the Boisi Center for Religion and American Public Life at Boston College in 1999 with a $5 million gift.

Former Prime Minister of the United Kingdom and recent Catholic convert Tony Blair (currently at Yale) addressed them, according to a 2009 report.

Among the members of the volunteer group reported in 2008 were Adobe Systems chairman Charles Geschke, Korn/Ferry chief executive Paul Reilly, former Freddie Mac CEO Richard Syron, Gerard R. Roche of Heidrick & Struggles, and former McKinsey managing director Frederick Gluck. Lawrence Bossidy, former CEO of Honeywell, has been a pro bono consultant. Kerry Robinson serves as the organization's Global Ambassador. Kim Smolik, Ed.D. is the current CEO.

References

Catholic Church in the United States
Catholic Church sexual abuse scandals in the United States